Dávid Betlehem (born 4 September 2003) is a Hungarian competitive pool and open water swimmer. At the 2022 World Aquatics Championships, he won a silver medal in the open water 4×1500 metre team relay. At the 2020 European Aquatics Championships, he won a bronze medal in the 5 kilometre open water team relay. At the 2022 World Junior Open Water Championships, he won gold medals in the 10 kilometre open water swim and team relay. He won the silver medal in the 1500 metre freestyle at the 2021 European Junior Swimming Championships.

Background
Betlehem was born 4 September 2003 in Szombathely, Hungary, and trains with coach László Szokolai as part of the Balaton Úszó Klub swim club.

Career

2018
At the 2018 FINA World Junior Open Water Swimming Championships, held in September in the Gulf of Eilat by Eilat, Israel, Betlehem won the bronze medal in the 5 kilometre open water swim with a time of 58 minutes and 56.5 seconds, finishing less than three seconds behind gold medalist Aleksandr Stepanov of Russia and one second behind silver medalist Ivan Morgun of Russia.

2021
Betlehem started his competition at the 2020 European Aquatics Championships, held in Budapest, Hungary, with the 5 kilometre open water swim on 12 May 2021, placing twelfth with a time of 56:00.4. Three days later, he won a bronze medal as part of the 5 kilometre open water team relay, contributing to a final time of 54 minutes and 18.5 seconds with relay teammates Réka Rohács, Anna Olasz, and Kristóf Rasovszky. For his third and final event, the 1500 metre freestyle held as part of pool swimming competition, he swam a time of 15:18.18 in the preliminaries on 18 May, placing twelfth overall.

Two months later, at the 2021 European Junior Swimming Championships, held at Stadio Olimpico del Nuoto in Rome, Italy, Betlehem won the bronze medal in the 1500 metre freestyle with a personal best time of 15:02.28. In November, he competed at the 2021 European Short Course Swimming Championships, conducted at the Palace of Water Sports in Kazan, Russia, placing seventh in the 800 metre freestyle, eleventh in the 1500 metre freestyle, and seventeenth in the 400 metre freestyle. The following month, as part of the first ever FINA 4×1500 metre mixed gender open water team relay event, contested at the Abu Dhabi Aquatics Festival in Abu Dhabi, United Arab Emirates for the last leg of the 2021 Marathon Swim World Series, he swam the third leg of the relay to help win the silver medal in a final time of 1:06:51.7.

2022

World open water season beginnings
In May 2022, on the first day of the first leg of the 2022 Marathon Swim World Series, held at Albarquel in Setúbal, Portugal, Betlehem placed seventh in the 10 kilometre swim with a time of 1:55:14.70. The next day, he won a bronze medal as part of the 4×1500 metre team relay event. At the 2022 World Aquatics Championships the following month, with open water swimming contested in the waters of Lupa Lake in Budapest, Hungary, he started off with a silver medal in the 4×1500 metre open water team relay, helping finish less than three seconds behind the gold medal team from Germany in 1:04:43.0. In the 5 kilometre open water swim the following day, 27 June, he placed seventh with a time of 54 minutes and 22.0 seconds. For his final event, on 29 June, Betlehem persisted to be the only male swimmer representing Hungary to cross the finish line in the 10 kilometre open water swim, after teammate Kristóf Rasovszky was kicked in the stomach and had to withdraw from competition halfway through the race for medical reasons, placing fifth in a time of 1 hour, 51 minutes and 29.8 seconds.

At the second leg of the 2022 Marathon Swim World Series, held in early July at Parc de la Villette in Paris, France, Betlehem initially placed third in the 10 kilometre swim with a time of 1 hour, 51 minutes and 41.95 seconds. However, FINA updated the medals and times for the event to change his placing from third to fourth after reviewing the results post-competition, instead allocating the medal to Nicholas Sloman of Australia.

2022 Hungarian Open Water Championships
Later in the month, at the 2022 Hungarian National Open Water Championships, Betlehem was the fastest male competitor of all ages, junior and senior, with a time of 1:52:26.5, however due to his age, 18 years old, he was too young to be eligible for a senior title, thus he won the junior national title instead of the senior national title.

2022 European Aquatics Championships
Betlehem was one of two Hungarian swimmers named to the official roster for Hungary in both pool swimming and open water swimming for the 2022 European Aquatics Championships, held in August in Rome, Italy. The first day of open water swimming competition at the Championships, 20 August, he placed seventh in the 5 kilometre open water swim, finishing in a time of 52:34.6, which was 21.1 seconds behind gold medalist Gregorio Paltrinieri of Italy. Originally, he was supposed to compete with the other swimmers in the event on 18 August, however extreme weather and waves resulted in all competitors competing two days after the intended date. In his first event on the final day, 21 August, he finished in a time of 1:51:09.8 in the 10 kilometre open water swim, placing ninth. Finishing off the Championships with the open water mixed team relay later in the day, he helped win the silver medal in a time of 59:53.9, swimming the third leg of the relay.

World open water season conclusion
Less than one week later, Betlehem won the bronze medal in the 10 kilometre open water swim at leg three of the 2022 Marathon Swim World Series, held at Lake Mégantic in Lac-Mégantic, Canada, finishing in a time of 1:50:52.00 and bringing his total ranking across the first three legs of the World Series up to third. In September, at the 2022 World Junior Open Water Swimming Championships in Seychelles, he won the gold medal in the 10 kilometre open water swim with a time of 1:53:10.30. The following day, he helped win the gold medal in the 4×1500 metre open water relay, anchoring the relay to a first-place finish and a final time of 1:11:20.10. Two months later, at the final leg of the World Series, in November in Eilat, Israel, he won the bronze medal in the 10 kilometre open water swim with a time of 1:46:44.20 and ranked as the third overall highest-scoring male competitor across the entire World Series circuit.

2022 Hungarian Short Course Championships
At the 2022 Hungarian National Short Course Championships held in mid-November in Kaposvár, Betlehem won the gold medal and national title in the 1500 metre freestyle with a personal best time of 14:36.83, which was over two full seconds faster than the second-place finisher. In his other events, he won the silver medal in the 800 metre freestyle with a personal best time of 7:39.54, won the bronze medal in the 400 metre freestyle with a personal best time of 3:43.69, and placed sixth in the 200 metre freestyle with a personal best time of 1:46.97.

International championships

Open water and long course metres (50 m pool)

Short course metres (25 m pool)

Personal best times

Long course metres (50 m pool)

Short course metres (25 m pool)

Marathon Swim World Series circuits
Betlehem has won the following medals at Marathon Swim World Series circuits.

References

External links
 

2003 births
Living people
Hungarian male swimmers
Hungarian male freestyle swimmers
European Aquatics Championships medalists in swimming
World Aquatics Championships medalists in open water swimming